Aikido techniques are frequently referred to as waza 技 (which is Japanese for technique, art or skill). Aikido training is based primarily on two partners practicing pre-arranged forms (kata) rather than freestyle practice. The basic pattern is for the receiver of the technique (uke) to initiate an attack against the person who applies the technique—the 取り tori, or shite , (depending on aikido style) also referred to as ( nage (when applying a throwing technique), who neutralises this attack with an aikido technique.

Both halves of the technique, that of uke and that of tori, are considered essential to aikido training. Both are studying aikido principles of blending and adaptation. Tori learns to blend with and control attacking energy, while uke learns to become calm and flexible in the disadvantageous, off-balance positions in which tori places him. This "receiving" of the technique is called ukemi. Uke continuously seeks to regain balance and cover vulnerabilities (e.g., an exposed side), while tori uses position and timing to keep uke off-balance and vulnerable. In more advanced training, uke may apply  to regain balance and pin or throw tori.

 refers to the act of receiving a technique. Good ukemi involves attention to the technique, the partner and the immediate environment - it is an active rather than a passive "receiving" of Aikido. The fall itself is part of Aikido, and is a way for the practitioner to receive, safely, what would otherwise be a devastating strike or throw (or joint lock control) and return to a standing position in one fluid movement. The person throwing (or applying other technique) must take into account the ukemi ability of his partner, as well as the physical space: walls, weapons (wooden tantō, bokken, jō) on the tatami, and the aikido practitioners nearby.

Uke must attack with a strength and speed appropriate to the skill level of the tori; in the case of beginners, this means an attack of far less severity than would be encountered in a real-life self-defense situation.

Training techniques
   /   teaches movement from the hip rather than relying on muscle strength of the arms
 trains students to enter with both arms forward in the tegatana (手刀) position.
 altering the direction of an incoming attack
   /  /  breathing is important in the execution of all aikido techniques. Here "breathing" has an additional meaning of  "match with" or "accord," as the efforts of tori must agree with the direction and strength with which his wrists are held by uke.

Initial attacks

Aikido techniques are usually a defense against an attack; therefore, to practice aikido with their partner, students must learn to deliver various types of attacks. Although attacks are not studied as thoroughly as in striking-based disciplines such as karate or boxing, "honest" or "sincere" attacks (a strong strike or an immobilizing grab) are needed to study correct and effective application of technique.

Other techniques, which appear to explicitly be punches (tsuki), are also practiced as thrusts with a knife or sword. Kicks are generally reserved for upper-level variations; reasons cited include that falls from kicks are especially dangerous, and that kicks (high kicks in particular) were uncommon during the types of combat prevalent in feudal Japan. Some basic strikes include:
  a vertical knifehand strike to the head. In training, this is usually directed at the forehead or the crown for safety, but more dangerous versions of this attack target the bridge of the nose and the maxillary sinus.
  a diagonal knifehand strike to the side of the head or neck.
  a punch to the torso. Specific targets include the chest, abdomen, and solar plexus.
  a punch to the face.
 Being attacked with a sword or bokken, usually reserved for upper level practitioners.
 Being attacked with a tantō, usually a wooden one.
 Being attacked with a jō . Being attacked by any wooden staff is called bōtori (棒取り) or tsuetori (杖取り)

Beginners in particular often practice techniques from grabs, both because they are safer and because it is easier to feel the energy and lines of force of a hold than a strike. Some grabs are historically derived from being held while trying to draw a weapon; a technique could then be used to free oneself and immobilize or strike the attacker who is grabbing the defender.
  one hand grabs one wrist.
  both hands grab one wrist. Same as 
  both hands grab both wrists.
  a shoulder grab.
  grabbing the (clothing of the) chest.

Techniques 

When all attacks are considered, aikido has over 10,000 nameable techniques. Many aikido techniques derive from Daitō-ryū Aiki-jūjutsu, but some others were invented by Morihei Ueshiba. The precise terminology for some may vary between organizations and styles; what follows are the terms used by the Aikikai Foundation. (Note that despite the names of the first five techniques listed, they are not universally taught in numeric order.) Several techniques (e.g. the "drop" throws) are also shared with judo, which can be considered a "cousin" of aikido due to their shared jujutsu background. 

Immobilizing techniques 
 , a control using one hand on the elbow and one hand near the wrist which leverages uke to the ground (also called 腕押さえ, ude osae, "arm pin"). This grip also applies pressure into the ulnar nerve at the wrist.
 , a pronating wristlock (小手回し, kote mawashi, "forearm turn") that torques the arm and applies painful nerve pressure. There is an adductive wristlock or Z-lock in ura version.
 , a rotational wristlock (小手捻り, kote hineri, "forearm twist") that directs upward-spiraling tension throughout the arm, elbow and shoulder.
 , a shoulder control similar to ikkyō, but with both hands gripping the forearm (also called 小手押さえ, kote osae, "forearm pin"). The knuckles (from the palm side) are applied to the recipient's radial nerve against the periosteum of the forearm bone.
 , visually similar to ikkyō, but with an inverted grip of the wrist, medial rotation of the arm and shoulder, and downward pressure on the elbow (also called 腕伸ばし, ude nobashi). Common in knife and other weapon take-aways.
, also called .
, an elbow lock generally used for knife thrusts or straight punches.
Note that the name of this technique varies with organizations, and that ude-garami may also refer to a different technique altogether (see below, arm entanglement throw).
, a class of techniques which involve immobilizing the elbow through locks.
, a variety of techniques that involve applying chokes.

Yoshinkan terminology 
The Yoshinkan school retains these Daitō-ryū Aiki-jūjutsu terms for the "first" through "fourth" techniques:
 一ケ条 Ikkajo
 二ケ条 Nikajo
 三ケ条 Sankajo
 四ケ条 Yonkajo

Throwing techniques 

 . From a standing position where the tori and uke are side-by-side, the tori throws the uke backward with a raised arm cutting backwards and downwards.

 . The hand is folded back past the shoulder, locking the shoulder joint.
, a supinating wristlock-throw that stretches the extensor digitorum.

 , throws in which tori moves through the space occupied by uke. The classic form superficially resembles a "clothesline" technique.
  beginning with ryōte-dori; moving forward, tori sweeps one hand low ("earth") and the other high ("heaven"), which unbalances uke so that he or she easily topples over.
  aikido's version of the hip throw. Tori drops his or her hips lower than those of uke, then flips uke over the resultant fulcrum.
  or  a throw that locks the arms against each other (The kanji for "10" is a cross-shape: 十).
  tori sweeps the arm back until it locks the shoulder joint, then uses forward pressure to throw.
, sometimes also considered a type of breath throw.
, from behind, the tori extends the uke's arm slightly downwards and places the other arm outstretched under the uke's upper arm, then moves the whole body forward. Can also be considered a form of breath throw.
, where the tori grabs both of the uke's knees and lifts them up, throwing the uke backward.
. Note that the name ude-garami is sometimes used by different schools to refer to a different immobilisation technique (see above, arm entanglement).

Breath throws 
 is a loose term for various types of mechanically unrelated techniques, although they generally do not end in joint locks like the immobilising techniques. The names of specific techniques may vary across organizations and dojos. Different types of kokyū-nage may include:

 , where the tori throws the uke backwards. This technique is sometimes simply referred to as the main kokyū-nage technique, or separately as the breath method, kokyū-hō (see above, under throwing techniques).
 . Against an opposite stance single-hand grab, the throw can be referred to by the opening movement tenkan tsugiashi (転換継ぎ足), which is a rear pivot followed by a forward step.
 . The technique begins similar to that of a regular rotary throw (kaiten-nage), but then transitions into a forward throw. Against an opposite stance single-hand grab, these two variations can be named by their opening movements as irimi kaiten (入身回転) and irimi tenkan (入身転換) breath throws respectively.
Variations on immobilizing techniques
. This throw begins as if the tori were performing a regular ikkyō technique, using both arms raised to connect with the uke's attack. But instead of going into the arm pin, the tori pushes the uke backward instead.
. Similar to the first teaching throw, but instead of throwing the uke backward, the tori transitions into a drop technique by cutting down or controlling the uke's attacking arm, as seen in the cutting (kiri-otoshi) or floating drops (uki-otoshi). This results in throwing the uke forward.
. The tori performs the third teaching technique until the first lock, where the uke's elbow is pointing skyward, and then throws the uke forward.

 

 
 
 
 

Hip breath throws

Implementations

Aikido makes use of body movement (tai sabaki) to blend with uke. For example, an "entering" (irimi) technique consists of movements inward towards uke, while a  technique uses a pivoting motion.
Additionally, an  technique takes place in front of uke, whereas an  technique takes place to his side; a  technique is applied with motion to the front of uke, and a  version is applied with motion towards the rear of uke, usually by incorporating a turning or pivoting motion. Finally, most techniques can be performed while in a seated posture (seiza). Techniques where both uke and tori are sitting are called suwari-waza, and techniques performed with uke standing and tori sitting are called hanmi handachi.

Thus, from fewer than twenty basic techniques, there are thousands of possible implementations. For instance, ikkyō can be applied to an opponent moving forward with a strike (perhaps with an ura type of movement to redirect the incoming force), or to an opponent who has already struck and is now moving back to reestablish distance (perhaps an omote-waza version). Specific aikido kata are typically referred to with the formula "attack-technique(-modifier)". For instance, katate-dori ikkyō refers to any ikkyō technique executed when uke is holding one wrist. This could be further specified as katate-dori ikkyō omote, referring to any forward-moving ikkyō technique from that grab.

Atemi are strikes (or feints) employed during an aikido technique. Some view atemi as attacks against "vital points" meant to cause damage in and of themselves. For instance, Gōzō Shioda described using atemi in a brawl to quickly down a gang's leader. Others consider atemi, especially to the face, to be methods of distraction meant to enable other techniques. A strike, whether or not it is blocked, can startle the target and break his or her concentration. The target may also become unbalanced in attempting to avoid the blow, for example by jerking the head back, which may allow for an easier throw.
Many sayings about atemi are attributed to Morihei Ueshiba, who considered them an essential element of technique.

See also
List of judo techniques
List of karate terms
Jujutsu techniques

References

External links

Aikido